Tocsin is an unincorporated community in Lancaster Township, Wells County, in the U.S. state of Indiana. It is on the border with Jefferson Township.

History
Tocsin was platted in 1884. A post office was established at Tocsin in 1882, and remained in operation until it was discontinued in 1966.

Geography

References

Unincorporated communities in Wells County, Indiana
Unincorporated communities in Indiana
Fort Wayne, IN Metropolitan Statistical Area